Franc Reyes (usually stylized as Franc. Reyes) is an American film director, screenwriter, producer, dancer and choreographer of Puerto Rican descent. In 2002 he won the ALMA Award for Emerging Filmmaker. Films he has directed include Empire, which opened the New York International Latino Film Festival, and Illegal Tender.

Films

References

External links
Interview with Franc. Reyes at blackfilm.com
Interview at TheOneNetwork

African-American screenwriters
Screenwriters from New York (state)
African-American film directors
American male screenwriters
People from the Bronx
Puerto Rican film directors
Living people
Film directors from New York City
1961 births
21st-century African-American people
20th-century African-American people
African-American male writers